South Russia may refer:
 Southern Russia
 South Russia (1919–1920), a territory that existed during the Russian Civil War
 South Russian Government
 Government of South Russia

See also
 South Russian Ovcharka, a breed of sheepdog
 Southern Russian dialects